Bulgaria competed at the 1998 Winter Paralympics in Nagano, Japan. 3 competitors from Bulgaria won no medals and so did not place in the medal table.

See also 
 Bulgaria at the Paralympics
 Bulgaria at the 1998 Winter Olympics

References 

Bulgaria at the Paralympics
1998 in Bulgarian sport
Nations at the 1998 Winter Paralympics